Albanian roach is a common name for several fish in the family Cyprinidae and may refer to:

Pachychilon pictum
Leucos basak